Mario Ignacio Osbén Méndez (14 July 1950 – 7 February 2021) was a Chilean footballer who played as a goalkeeper. Nicknamed "El Gato" ("The Cat"), he played for Ñublense, Club de Deportes Concepción, Unión Española, Colo Colo and Cobreloa during his professional career. He represented the Chile national team at the 1982 FIFA World Cup, playing all three matches. In total he played 36 matches for his country between 1979 and 1988, making his debut on 11 July 1979 in a friendly against Uruguay.

Death
Osbén died on 7 February 2021 aged 70. After suffering a heart attack in Chiguayante, his city of birth, he had been taken to hospital in Concepción where his death was confirmed.

References

External links 
 
 

1950 births
2021 deaths
Chilean footballers
Deportes Concepción (Chile) footballers
Unión Española footballers
Ñublense footballers
Colo-Colo footballers
Cobreloa footballers
Association football goalkeepers
Chile international footballers
1982 FIFA World Cup players
1979 Copa América players
1987 Copa América players
People from Concepción Province, Chile